Stara Kamienica  is a village in Karkonosze County, Lower Silesian Voivodeship, in south-western Poland. It is the seat of the administrative district (gmina) called Gmina Stara Kamienica.

The village has a population of 1,200.

References

Villages in Karkonosze County